Fiorello! is a 1960 album by Oscar Peterson, of compositions from the musical Fiorello! by Sheldon Harnick and Jerry Bock.

Track listing
 "When Did I Fall in Love?" – 4:30
 "Little Tin Box" – 4:13
 "Home Again" – 3:01
 "Till Tomorrow" – 2:40
 "Politics and Poker" – 4:12
 "Gentleman Jimmy" – 3:27
 "Unfair" – 3:53
 "On the Side of Angels" – 6:33
 "Where Do I Go from Here?" – 4:23

All songs written by Sheldon Harnick and Jerry Bock.

Personnel

Performance
Oscar Peterson - piano
Ray Brown - double bass
Ed Thigpen - drums

References

1960 albums
Oscar Peterson albums
Albums produced by Norman Granz
Verve Records albums